WBC Montana 2003 is a women's basketball club from Montana in Bulgaria. The first women's team of Montana took professional status in 1989 under the name "Sepetemvriyska Slava." In 1992 it was renamed just "Montana." The team ceased to exist in 2002 but was refounded in 2003 under the name "Montana 2003".

Title
  Bulgarian Women's Basketball Championship (5): 2000, 2005, 2016, 2018, 2019
  Bulgarian Women's Basketball Cup (9): 1995, 1996, 1998, 2000, 2009, 2014, 2016, 2018, 2019.
  Bulgarian Women's Basketball Super Cup (3): 2017, 2018, 2019.

Other successes
 WABA League :  2018, 2020,  2021

External links
 Profile at bgbasket.com
 Profile at basketball.bg
 Profile at eutobasket.com

Montana 2003
Montana 2003